The Bombay Jazz Palace is a compilation album released on CD in the UK by Outcaste Records on 28 January 2002. The fourteen tracks featured on the CD are all influenced by both traditional Indian music, and various species of jazz and funk. The majority of the album's music dates from the 1970s or late 60s, forming part of the Western counterculture's growing interest in Asian culture.

The first ten songs are by European and American musicians exploring the instrumentation, rhythms, and scales of Indian music, with varying degrees of authenticity. The final four songs show a kind of mirror-image, with Indian musicians taking influence from popular idioms of Western music from the 1970s.

Notable musicians featured include Lalo Schifrin, Dave Pike, Ravi Shankar, and George Harrison.

The album has never seen a release outside of the UK, and received little attention in the mainstream press, although it was given a small review in The Guardian.

Intriguingly, the Outcaste Records website suggests that track 11 is 'Tal Mala', by the Diga Rhythm Band. This does not correspond to the CD's sleeve notes, nor to the music itself.

The album was 'compiled by Harv and Sunny aka Sutrasonic', with 'additional project research by Mandeep Gill'. The sleeve notes are by John Lewis.

Track listing 

 Paul Horn & Nexus – Latin Tala
 Volker Kriegal – Zoom
 Georges Garvarenz – Haschish Party
 Dave Mackay & Vicky Hamilton – Blues for Hari
 The Dave Pike Set – Raga Jeera Swara
 Between – Contemplation
 Lalo Schifrin – Secret Code
 Grupo Batuque – Tabla Samba
 Yves Hyatt – Path To Ascension
 Shocking Blue – Acka Raga
 Shankar Family & Friends – Dispute & Violence
 Shankar-Jaikishan – Raga Bairagi
 Ananda Shankar – Universal Magic
 Muhavishla Ravi Hatchud & the Indo Jazz Following – Bombay Palace Pt.1

References 

2002 compilation albums